Gerhard Feige (born 19 November 1951) is a German prelate of the Roman Catholic Church who has been bishop of the Roman Catholic Diocese of Magdeburg since 2005. Feige previously was the auxiliary bishop of the Diocese of Magdeburg from 1999 to 2005.

Biography

Early life 
George Feige was born born in Halle, East Germany.

Priesthood 
Feige was ordained a priest on 1 July 1978 for the Diocese of Magdeburg and worked in Salzwedel. He promoted and worked as a teacher of church history, patrology and study of eastern churches.

Episcopacy 
On 11 September 1999 he was appointed titular bishop of Tisedi and an auxiliary bishop of Magdeburg. On 23 February 2005, he was appointed bishop of Magdeburg and installed on 16 April 2005. He succeeded Leo Nowak.

Since 2004, Feige has served as one of two co-chairmen of the Saint Irenaeus Joint Orthodox-Catholic Working Group, an ecumenical group of Catholic and Eastern Orthodox theologians—clerics and lay people—which promotes unity and investigates the differences between these Christian traditions.

Feige is a member of the Dicastery for Promoting Christian Unity and a chairman of the Ecumenical Commission of the German Bishops' Conference.

Views 
When asked about the potential ordination of women in January 2019, Feige said that the question remained open while recognizing that such a path is unlikely. He added that there is a possibility for married clergy in the Roman Catholic Church, as witnessed by the sacramental dignity of married Orthodox priests.

In January 2020, Feige, the then-head of the German bishops' commission on ecumenism, voiced skepticism about a recent proposal by German theologians to give Protestants the ability to receive Communion in Catholic churches.

External links 
Catholic Hierarchy bio

References 

1951 births
Roman Catholic bishops of Magdeburg
20th-century German Roman Catholic bishops
21st-century German Roman Catholic bishops
Living people
People from Halle (Saale)
20th-century German Roman Catholic priests
21st-century Roman Catholic bishops in Germany